The 1986 Austrian Supercup was a football match that saw the 1985–86 Bundesliga and 1985–86 Austrian Cup champions Austria Wien face off against 1985-86 Austrian Cup finalists Rapid Wien. The match was held on 19 July 1986 at the Gerhard Hanappi Stadium in Vienna. This was the inaugural Austrian Supercup, which went on to be played until 2004.

Match details

See also
1985–86 Austrian Football Bundesliga
1985–86 Austrian Cup

Austrian Supercup